Radosava Kočanović (born 11 November 1994) is a Montenegrin footballer who plays as a midfielder for 1. ŽFL club ŽFK Breznica. She has officially played for the senior Montenegro women's national team.

International career
Kočanović capped for Montenegro at senior level during the 2015 FIFA Women's World Cup qualification – UEFA Group 6, in a 0–10 home loss to England on 17 September 2014.

References

1994 births
Living people
Women's association football midfielders
Montenegrin women's footballers
Montenegro women's international footballers
ŽFK Breznica players